The River Bourne is a river in the English county of Berkshire. It is a tributary of the River Pang and, indirectly, of the River Thames.  The Bourne's source is near the village of Chapel Row and it joins the River Pang south of the M4 motorway near the village of Tidmarsh.

See also
List of rivers in England

References

Bourne
2Bourne